Tesla, Inc. (  or  ) is an American multinational automotive and clean energy company headquartered in Austin, Texas. Tesla designs and manufactures electric vehicles (electric cars and trucks), battery energy storage from home to grid-scale, solar panels and solar roof tiles, and related products and services. Tesla is one of the world's most valuable companies and is, the world's most valuable automaker. In 2021, the company had the most worldwide sales of battery electric vehicles and plug-in electric vehicles, capturing 21% of the battery-electric (purely electric) market and 14% of the plug-in market (which includes plug-in hybrids). Through its subsidiary Tesla Energy, the company develops and is a major installer of photovoltaic systems in the United States. Tesla Energy is also one of the largest global suppliers of battery energy storage systems, with 3.99 gigawatt-hours (GWh) installed in 2021.

Tesla was incorporated in July 2003 by Martin Eberhard and Marc Tarpenning as Tesla Motors. The company's name is a tribute to inventor and electrical engineer Nikola Tesla. In February 2004, via a $6.5 million investment, Elon Musk became the largest shareholder of the company. He has served as CEO since 2008. According to Musk, the purpose of Tesla is to help expedite the move to sustainable transport and energy, obtained through electric vehicles and solar power. Tesla began production of its first car model, the Roadster sports car, in 2008. This was followed by the Model S sedan in 2012, the Model X SUV in 2015, the Model 3 sedan in 2017, the Model Y crossover in 2020, and the Tesla Semi truck in 2022. The company plans to start production of the Cybertruck light-duty pickup truck in 2023. The Model 3 is the all-time bestselling plug-in electric car worldwide, and, in June 2021, became the first electric car to sell 1 million units globally. Tesla's 2022 full year deliveries were around 1.31 million vehicles, a 40% increase over the previous year, and cumulative sales totaled 3 million cars as of August 2022. In October 2021, Tesla's market capitalization reached $1 trillion, the sixth company to do so in U.S. history.

Tesla has been the subject of several lawsuits, government scrutiny, journalistic criticism, and public controversies arising from statements and acts of CEO Elon Musk and from allegations of whistleblower retaliation, worker rights violations, and defects with their products.

History

Founding (2003–2004) 
The company was incorporated as Tesla Motors, Inc. on July 1, 2003, by Martin Eberhard and Marc Tarpenning. Eberhard and Tarpenning served as CEO and CFO, respectively. Eberhard said he wanted to build "a car manufacturer that is also a technology company", with its core technologies as "the battery, the computer software, and the proprietary motor".

Ian Wright was Tesla's third employee, joining a few months later. In February 2004, the company raised $7.5 million in series A funding, including $6.5 million from Elon Musk, who had received $100 million from the sale of his interest in PayPal two years earlier. Musk became the chairman of the board of directors and the largest shareholder of Tesla. J. B. Straubel joined Tesla in May 2004 as chief technical officer.

A lawsuit settlement agreed to by Eberhard and Tesla in September 2009 allows all five – Eberhard, Tarpenning, Wright, Musk, and Straubel – to call themselves co-founders.

Roadster (2005–2009) 

Elon Musk took an active role within the company and oversaw Roadster product design at a detailed level, but was not deeply involved in day-to-day business operations. The company's strategy was to start with a premium sports car aimed at early adopters and then move into more mainstream vehicles, including sedans and affordable compacts.

In February 2006, Musk led Tesla's Series B venture capital funding round of $13 million, which added Valor Equity Partners to the funding team. Musk co-led the third, $40 million round in May 2006 which saw investment from prominent entrepreneurs including Google co-founders Sergey Brin and Larry Page, and former eBay President Jeff Skoll. A fourth round worth $45 million in May 2007 brought the total private financing investment to over $105 million.

Tesla's first car, the Roadster, was officially revealed to the public on July 19, 2006, in Santa Monica, California, at a 350-person invitation-only event held in Barker Hangar at Santa Monica Airport.

In August 2007, Eberhard was asked by the board, led by Elon Musk, to step down as CEO. Eberhard then took the title of "President of Technology" before ultimately leaving the company in January 2008. Co-founder Marc Tarpenning, who served as the Vice President of Electrical Engineering of the company, also left the company in January 2008. In August 2007, Michael Marks was brought in as interim CEO, and in December 2007, Ze'ev Drori became CEO and President. Musk succeeded Drori as CEO in October 2008. In June 2009, Eberhard filed a lawsuit against Musk for allegedly forcing him out.

Tesla began production of the Roadster in 2008.

By January 2009, Tesla had raised $187 million and delivered 147 cars. Musk had contributed $70 million of his own money to the company.

In June 2009, Tesla was approved to receive $465 million in interest-bearing loans from the United States Department of Energy. The funding, part of the $8 billion Advanced Technology Vehicles Manufacturing Loan Program, supported engineering and production of the Model S sedan, as well as the development of commercial powertrain technology. Tesla repaid the loan in May 2013, with $12 million interest.

IPO, Model S, and Model X (2010–2015) 

In May 2010, Tesla purchased what would later become the Tesla Factory in Fremont, California, from Toyota for $42 million, and opened the facility in October 2010 to start production of the Model S. On June 29, 2010, the company became a public company via an initial public offering (IPO) on NASDAQ, the first American car company to do so since the Ford Motor Company had its IPO in 1956. The company issued 13.3 million shares of common stock at a price of $17.00 per share, raising $226 million.

In January 2012, Tesla ceased production of the Roadster, and in June the company launched its second car, the Model S luxury sedan. The Model S won several automotive awards during 2012 and 2013, including the 2013 Motor Trend Car of the Year, and became the first electric car to top the monthly sales ranking of a country, when it achieved first place in the Norwegian new car sales list in September 2013. The Model S was also the bestselling plug-in electric car worldwide for the years 2015 and 2016.

Tesla announced the Tesla Autopilot, a driver-assistance system, in 2014. In September that year, all Tesla cars started shipping with sensors and software to support the feature, with what would later be called "hardware version 1". In April 2015, Tesla entered the energy storage market, unveiling its Tesla Powerwall (home) and Tesla Powerpack (business) battery packs. The company received orders valued at $800 million within a week of the unveiling.

Tesla began shipping its third vehicle, the luxury SUV Tesla Model X, in September 2015, at which time it had 25,000 pre-orders.

SolarCity and Model 3 (2016–2018) 
In November 2016, Tesla acquired SolarCity, in an all-stock $2.6 billion deal, and entered the photovoltaics market. The solar installation business was merged with Tesla's existing battery energy storage products division to form the Tesla Energy subsidiary. The deal was controversial because at the time of the acquisition, SolarCity was facing liquidity issues of which Tesla's shareholders were not informed.

In February 2017, Tesla Motors changed its name to Tesla, Inc., to better reflect the scope of its expanded business, which now included electric vehicles, battery energy storage systems, and solar power generation.

That year Tesla also started its philanthropic effort. Tesla made multiple contributions of solar power to areas recovering from disasters in 2017, in particular installing a solar plus storage system to restore electricity at a hospital in Puerto Rico, following the destruction from Hurricane Maria. In July 2018, the company donated $37.5 million to kindergarten to 12th grade science, technology, engineering, and mathematics education in Nevada.

Tesla began selling its fourth vehicle model, the Model 3 sedan, in July 2017. The Model 3 was a cheaper vehicle compared to previous Tesla vehicles, and was intended for the mass market. It was highly anticipated, which prompted the company to try to speed up production. By August 2017, there were 455,000 reservations for the Model 3. The rollout was plagued by delays and production problems. This increased pressure on the company, which at this time was one of the most shorted companies in the market.

In August 2018, CEO Elon Musk briefly considered taking Tesla private. The plan did not materialize, and gave rise to much controversy and many lawsuits including a securities fraud charge from the SEC. By the end of 2018, the production problems had been overcome, and the Model 3 was the world's bestselling plug-in electric car for the year.

Global expansion and Model Y (2019–present) 
Tesla opened its first "Gigafactory" outside the United States in Shanghai, China, in 2019. Giga Shanghai was the first automobile factory in China fully owned by a foreign company, and was built in less than six months. The following year Tesla also started construction on a new Gigafactory near Berlin, Germany, and another in Texas, United States. In March 2020, Tesla began deliveries of its fifth vehicle model, the Model Y crossover.

On January 10, 2020, Tesla reached a market capitalization of $86 billion, breaking the record for highest valuation of any American automaker. On June 10, 2020, Tesla's market capitalization surpassed those of BMW, Daimler and Volkswagen combined. The next month, Tesla reached a valuation of $206 billion, surpassing Toyota's $202 billion to become the world's most valuable automaker by market capitalization. On August 31, 2020, following this increase in value, Tesla had a 5-for-1 stock split.

From July 2019 to June 2020, Tesla reported four profitable quarters in a row for the first time, which made it eligible for inclusion in the S&P 500. Tesla was added to the index on December 21, 2020. It was the largest company ever added, and the sixth-largest company in the index at the time of its inclusion. As investors tried to buy more shares as a result of this inclusion, some analysts, such as J.P. Morgan's Ryan Brinkman, suggested investors exercise caution as Tesla was "dramatically" overvalued. Throughout 2020, the share price of Tesla increased 740%, and on January 26, 2021, its market capitalization reached $848 billion, more than the next nine largest automakers combined and making it the 5th most valuable company in the US.

From 2015 to 2020, Tesla acquired companies including Riviera Tool, Grohmann Engineering, Perbix, Compass Automation, Hibar Systems, and German ATW Automation to advance Tesla's expertise in automation, along with Maxwell Technologies and SilLion to add to Tesla's abilities in battery technology. Grohmann (renamed Tesla Automation) and Maxwell would continue to operate as subsidiary companies, while the rest would be merged into Tesla. In July 2021, Musk acknowledged that Tesla had sold Maxwell to the former VP of sales for Maxwell.

In January 2020, Tesla donated  ($723,000 in 2020 dollars) to the Chinese Center for Disease Control and Prevention to fight the COVID-19 pandemic in mainland China.

In October 2020, Tesla told Electrek that it had dissolved its public relations (PR) department (with the exception of a few PR managers representing Tesla's European and Asian markets), becoming the first automaker to do so.

Tesla hit its goal of building 500,000 cars in 2020. The company ended the year with over $19 billion of cash, compared to $6.3 billion at the end of 2019.

In February 2021, Tesla revealed that it had invested $1.5 billion in bitcoin in 2020 and on March 24 the company started accepting bitcoin as a form of payment for vehicle purchases in the United States and stated that it would introduce bitcoin payment in other countries later that year. At the time, Musk tweeted that "Bitcoin paid to Tesla will be retained as Bitcoin, not converted to fiat currency." It was later revealed in financial documents that between January 1 and March 31, 2021, Tesla had made a $101 million profit on the sale of bitcoin. After 49 days of accepting the digital currency, the company reversed course on May 12, 2021, saying they would no longer take bitcoin due to concerns that "mining" the cryptocurrency was contributing to the consumption of fossil fuels and climate change. The decision resulted in the price of bitcoin dropping around 12% on May 13. During a July bitcoin conference, Musk suggested Tesla could help bitcoin miners switch to renewable energy in the future and also stated at the same conference that if bitcoin mining reaches, and trends above 50 percent renewable energy usage, that "Tesla would resume accepting bitcoin." The price for bitcoin rose after this announcement. In July 2022 it was reported that Tesla had sold about 75% of its bitcoin holdings. It was worth $936 million.

After earlier disputes with California officials over COVID-19 restrictions, on December 1, 2021, Tesla moved its headquarters from Palo Alto, California, to its Gigafactory in Austin, Texas. However, Musk stated that Tesla would continue to operate its Fremont factory in the San Francisco Bay Area, and will continue to expand in California. In September 2021, Tesla broke ground on a new battery factory in Lathrop, California, and signed a lease in October 2021 for additional office space in Palo Alto. Musk announced in February 2023 that Tesla would establish its global engineering headquarters in Palo Alto, moving into a corporate campus once owned by HP.

Also in October 2021, Tesla's market capitalization reached $1 trillion, the sixth company to do so in U.S. history, on news that car rental company Hertz had placed an order for 100,000 Tesla vehicles for its fleet.

On March 22, 2022, Tesla launched its new car factory outside Berlin, with Chief Executive Elon Musk handing over the first deliveries to customers. The US carmaker's Giga Berlin plant is the largest for electric vehicles in Europe. On April 7, 2022, Tesla celebrated the public opening of the Giga Texas facility with its Cyber Rodeo event attended by an estimated 15,000 invitees.

Musk said in an email sent to employees that he was reducing salaried headcount by 10 percent because the company had become "overstaffed in many areas", adding that "hourly headcount will increase." He also said in a tweet Tesla's total number of employees would increase over the next year, but said the number of salaried staff would remain "fairly flat".

In August 2022, Musk claimed that Tesla had made more than 3 million cars.

In 2023, Tesla had to pause plans to double Giga Shanghai production to 2 million cars per year after encountering roadblocks from the Chinese central government. Officials there expressed concerns with Elon's activities at SpaceX, in particular the quickly expanding military applications of Starlink and its potential impact on global strategic defense.

In March 2023, Musk announced that the next Gigafactory will be constructed in Monterrey, Mexico.

Automotive products 

, Tesla offers four car models: Model S, Model X, Model 3 and Model Y, and a semi-truck. Tesla's first vehicle, the first-generation Tesla Roadster, is no longer sold. Tesla has plans for a second-generation Roadster and a pickup called the Cybertruck.

In production

Model S 

The Model S is a five-door liftback sedan. Deliveries began on June 22, 2012. The car became the first electric vehicle to top the monthly sales ranking in any country, when it achieved first place in the Norwegian new car sales list in September 2013. The Model S won the 2013 Motor Trend Car of the Year, the 2013 "World Green Car", Automobile magazine's 2013 "Car of the Year", Time magazine's Best 25 Inventions of the Year 2012 award, as well as the 2019 Motor Trend "Ultimate Car of the Year".

The Model S was the bestselling plug-in electric car worldwide for the years 2015 and 2016, selling an estimated 50,931 units in 2016. By the end of 2017, it was the world's second bestselling plug-in electric car in history (after the Nissan Leaf), with global sales of 200,000 units.

Model X 

The Tesla Model X is a mid-size crossover SUV. It is offered in 5-, 6- and 7-passenger configurations. The Model X was developed from the full-sized sedan platform of the Model S. The rear passenger doors open vertically with an articulating "falcon-wing" design.

Deliveries started in September 2015. In 2016, after one full year on the market, the Model X ranked seventh among the world's bestselling plug-in cars. The United States is its main market, with an estimated 57,327 units sold through September 2018.

Model 3 

The Model 3 is a four-door fastback sedan. Tesla unveiled the Model 3 on March 31, 2016. Potential customers began reserving spots earlier that day with a refundable deposit. One week after the unveiling, Tesla reported over 325,000 reservations. Bloomberg News claimed that, due to the number of reservations, "the Model 3's unveiling was unique in the 100-year history of the mass-market automobile." Limited vehicle production began in July 2017.

Since March 2020, the Model 3 is the world's bestselling electric car in history, and cumulative global sales passed the 1 million milestone in June 2021. The Model 3 has ranked as the world's bestselling plug-in electric car for four consecutive years, from 2018 to 2021, and also as the bestselling plug-in electric car in the United States since 2018. The Model 3 also set records in Norway and the Netherlands, as the bestselling passenger car model in those countries in 2019.

Model Y 

The Model Y is a compact crossover utility vehicle. The Model Y is built on a platform that shares many components with the Model 3.

The Model Y was unveiled on March 14, 2019. Deliveries for the Model Y started on March 13, 2020. The Tesla Model Y is being manufactured at Tesla Factory in Fremont, California, as well as in Giga Shanghai in China. Giga Berlin produces the Performance, AWD and RWD versions of the Model Y.

Tesla Semi 

The Tesla Semi is an all-electric Class 8 semi-trailer truck announced in November 2017. The Semi will be powered by four independent electric motors of the type used in the Tesla Model 3 and will include an extensive set of hardware sensors to enable it to stay in its own lane, a safe distance away from other vehicles, and later, when software and regulatory conditions allow, provide self-driving operation on highways. Musk also announced that the company would be involved in installing a solar-powered global network of Tesla Megachargers to make the Semi more attractive to potential long-haul customers. A 30-minute charge would provide  of range.

Musk initially said in 2017 that Semi deliveries would start in 2019 and be selling 100,000 trucks a year, but deliveries were later delayed to 2021 and then 2022. Part of the reason for the delays, according to Musk, is that the Semi includes five times more battery cells than their passenger cars, and the battery supply is not yet sufficient for both Tesla cars and the Semi.

In October 2022, the company announced it would deliver its first all-electric semitrailer truck for PepsiCo in December, in what would be the first new model the company would give to consumers since the beginning of 2020, when it started delivering the Model Y crossover. At the time of the announcement, the trucks would support PepsiCo plants in Sacramento and Modesto, California.

Future products

Roadster (second generation) 

In a surprise reveal at the end of the event that introduced the Tesla Semi on November 16, 2017, Tesla unveiled the second generation Roadster. The SpaceX Package will include cold air thrusters that will increase the speed even more. The vehicle will have three electric motors allowing for all-wheel drive and torque vectoring during cornering.

At the time, the base price was set at $200,000, while the first 1,000 units (the Founder's series) will sell for $250,000. Reservations required a deposit of $50,000, and those who ordered the Founder's series paid the $250,000 in full upon ordering. Those who made a reservation at the event were allowed a test drive (with a driver) in the prototype. Deliveries are expected to start in 2023.

Cybertruck 

The Cybertruck is a pickup truck unveiled on November 21, 2019. Production has been delayed past 2022, and  it is scheduled to be Mid 2023. The truck's design had a mixed reception, and some Wall Street analysts questioned whether American pickup truck buyers will have interest in the Cybertruck. On September 22, 2020, Musk revealed roughly 600,000 Cybertruck preorders. James Goodwin, chief executive of ANCAP, said in 2019 that the design of the Cybertruck could pose safety risks, saying that the front "would look like it's not very forgiving". After the Cybertruck's unveiling, Musk announced that the Tesla Cyberquad, an electric four-wheel quad bike revealed alongside the Cybertruck, would be an optional accessory for Cybertruck buyers.

Tesla next-generation vehicle

The Tesla next-generation vehicle is an upcoming battery electric car under development by Tesla as of 2022. The unnamed next-generation vehicle will be the third mainstream platform for the company and Musk has claimed that its production volumes will greatly surpass those of the Model 3/Y platform, which would happen no earlier than 2025 according to Forbes.

Discontinued

Tesla Roadster 

The only discontinued Tesla vehicle model is the original Tesla Roadster. The Roadster was a two-seater sports car, evolved from the Lotus Elise chassis, that was produced from 2008 to 2012. It is also the first production car to be launched into space; Musk launched his Roadster into a Mars-crossing orbit on a SpaceX Falcon Heavy rocket test flight on February 6, 2018.

Other concepts 
On July 20, 2016, Musk detailed his new master plan "part deux" for Tesla. It includes more affordable cars produced in higher volume, solar roofs, mid-size vehicles, SUVs and pickup trucks, as well as the refinement of autonomous vehicles and the creation of a sharing economy, in which cars can be active while the owner is not using them. Tesla's plan also indicated building a minibus on the Model X platform, but in May 2017, Musk indicated that he might favor a 10–12 passenger version of the Model X over a dedicated minibus design. Musk dashed hopes for a Tesla motorcycle, saying in 2018 "we're not going to do motorcycles".

Also in 2016, Musk revealed Tesla's intention to produce a car cheaper than the Model 3. In 2018, Musk indicated a plan to enter a new market segment, offering a compact hatchback in "less than five years". In 2020, Musk said Tesla expects to have a $25,000 electric car within 3 years, which "will basically be on-par or slightly better than a comparable gasoline car".

In April 2019, Musk announced Tesla's intention to launch an autonomous taxi service by the end of 2020 using more than 1 million Tesla vehicles. A year later, in April 2020, Musk stated Tesla would not make the end of 2020 deadline but said, "we'll have the functionality necessary for full self-driving by the end of the year."

Tesla Energy products 

Tesla subsidiary Tesla Energy develops, builds, sells and installs solar energy generation systems and battery energy storage products (as well as related products and services) to residential, commercial and industrial customers.

The subsidiary was created by the merger of Tesla's existing battery energy storage products division with SolarCity, a solar energy company that Tesla acquired in 2016.

Tesla Energy's generation products include solar panels (built by other companies for Tesla), the Tesla Solar Roof (a solar shingle system) and the Tesla Solar Inverter. Other products include the Powerwall (a home energy storage device) and the Powerpack and Megapack, which are large-scale energy storage systems. Tesla Energy also develops software to allow customers to monitor and control their systems.

In 2021, the company deployed solar energy systems capable of generating 345 megawatts, an increase of 68% over 2020, and deployed 3.99 gigawatt-hours of battery energy storage products, an increase of 32% over 2020.

Other services 
Tesla receives service revenue from its vehicle customers after their initial purchase; these revenues reached $1.47 billion in 2022 Q2. , those services include vehicle servicing, charging, insurance, software upgrades, and improved connectivity. In July 2021, Tesla made Full Self-Driving available as a monthly subscription. Future services which have been discussed include paying for a Wi-Fi hotspot in the car and the Tesla robotaxi network.

Charging

Supercharger network 

In 2012, Tesla began building a network of 480-volt fast-charging Supercharger stations. , Tesla operates 36,165 Superchargers in 3,971 stations worldwide (an average of 9 chargers per station). The Supercharger is a proprietary direct current (DC) technology that provides up to 250 kilowatts (kW) of power. All Tesla cars except the first generation Roadster come standard with hardware to charge at Superchargers. The navigation software in Tesla cars can recommend the fastest route for long-distance travel, incorporating charging stops.

Model S and X cars ordered before January 15, 2017, and between August 3, 2019, and May 26, 2020, received free unlimited supercharging. Subsequent Tesla models never received free unlimited supercharging.

Destination charging location network 

In 2014, Tesla launched the "Destination Charging location" network by providing chargers to hotels, restaurants, shopping centers and resorts (and other locations where Tesla owners may spend an hour or more) to provide on-site vehicle charging at twice the power of a typical home charging station.

Destination chargers are installed free of charge by Tesla-certified contractors; the locations originally were required to provide the electricity at no cost to their customers. , locations with six or more destination chargers may start charging for electricity. All destination chargers appear in the in-car navigation system.

North American Charging Standard 

In November 2022, Tesla renamed its previously proprietary charging connector to "North American Charging Standard" (NACS), making the specs available to other EV manufacturers. The name was criticised, as at the time of the announcement the connector was not the standard in North America, with all other automakers using the Combined Charging System (CCS) connector. Tesla has argued that it's NACS should become the connector of choice because it is more compact, it's vehicles outnumber CCS equipped vehicles by a margin of two-to-one and that there are 60% more NACS connectors installed than CCS connectors.

Software updates and upgrades 
Tesla vehicles' software is regularly updated over-the-air when new software and firmware versions are released. This allows the cars to remain up to date and improve after purchase. Tesla also offers the option to unlock features in the car through over-the-air software upgrades after purchase. Available upgrades include basic Autopilot, Full Self Driving, acceleration boost (for Model 3 owners), and rear-heated seats (for Model 3 owners).

Connectivity 
All Tesla cars come with "Standard Connectivity" which provides navigation using a cellular connection, and the following only over Wi-Fi or Bluetooth: internet browsing, music streaming (with a paid subscription), and, when parked, video streaming and "caraoke". "Premium Connectivity" adds cellular access to those features and also provides live traffic and satellite maps for navigation.

Vehicle servicing 
Tesla service strategy is to service its vehicles first through remote diagnosis and repair. If it is not possible to resolve a problem remotely, customers are referred to a local Tesla-owned service center, or a mobile technician is dispatched. Tesla has said that it does not want to make a profit on vehicle servicing, which has traditionally been a large profit center for most auto dealerships.

In 2016, Tesla recommended having any Tesla car inspected every 12,500 miles or once a year, whichever comes first. In early 2019, the manual was changed to say: "your Tesla does not require annual maintenance and regular fluid changes," and instead it recommends periodic servicing of the brake fluid, air conditioning, tires and air filters.

Insurance 
On June 4, 2017, the American Automobile Association raised insurance rates for Tesla owners following a report from the Highway Loss Data Institute. The report concluded that the Model S crashes 46% more often and is 50% more expensive to repair than comparable vehicles. Similarly, the Model X was concluded to crash 41% more often and to be 89% more expensive to repair than similar vehicles. As a result, AAA raised insurance rates on Tesla cars by 30%. Tesla said that the analysis is "severely flawed and not reflective of reality", however, Tesla failed to provide any contradictory numbers. Shortly thereafter, Russ Rader, the spokesman for the Insurance Institute for Highway Safety, confirmed the AAA's analysis and that "Teslas get into a lot of crashes and are costly to repair afterward". The following year, an analysis of claim frequency and insurance cost data by the Insurance Institute for Highway Safety conducted by financial research provider 24/7 Wall St. found that the Tesla Model S and Model X were the two most expensive vehicles to insure. Musk stated that he expects these insurance rates will greatly decrease once driver-assist and self-driving technology become commonplace.

Starting in October 2017, Tesla partnered with Liberty Mutual Insurance Company to offer US customers an insurance plan designed specifically for Tesla cars. In August 2019, this partnership was superseded by a partnership with State National Insurance, but was initially only available to Tesla owners in California. In July 2020, Musk, relying on data obtained through the partnership with State National Insurance, announced that Tesla was creating its own "major" insurance company. Tesla claims the insurance uses individual vehicle data to offer personalized pricing.

, Tesla offers insurance in Arizona, California, Colorado, Illinois, Maryland, Minnesota, Nevada, Ohio, Oregon, Texas, Utah and Virginia.

Business strategy 

At the time of Tesla's founding in 2003, electric vehicles were very expensive. In 2006, Elon Musk stated that Tesla's strategy was to first produce high-price, low-volume vehicles, such as sports cars, for which customers are less sensitive to price. This would allow them to progressively bring down the cost of batteries, which in turn would allow them to offer cheaper and higher volume cars. Tesla's first vehicle, the Roadster, was low-volume (fewer than 2,500 were produced) and priced at over $100,000. The next models, the Model S and Model X, are more affordable but still luxury vehicles. The most recent models, the Model 3 and the Model Y, are priced still lower, and aimed at a higher volume market, selling over 100,000 vehicles each quarter. Tesla continuously updates the hardware of its cars rather than waiting for a new model year, as opposed to nearly every other car manufacturer.

Unlike other automakers, Tesla does not rely on franchised auto dealerships to sell vehicles. Instead, the company directly sells vehicles through its website and a network of company-owned stores. The company is the first automaker in the United States to sell cars directly to consumers. Some jurisdictions, particularly in the United States, prohibit auto manufacturers from directly selling vehicles to consumers. In these areas, Tesla has locations that it calls galleries that the company says "educate and inform customers about our products, but such locations do not actually transact in the sale of vehicles." In total, Tesla operates nearly 400 stores and galleries in more than 35 countries. These locations are typically located in retail shopping districts, inside shopping malls, or other high-traffic areas, instead of near other auto dealerships.

Tesla is notable for spending no money on paid advertising campaigns, unlike other automakers.

Tesla has a high degree of vertical integration, estimated at 80% in 2016. The company produces vehicle components as well as building proprietary stations where customers can charge their vehicles. Vertical integration is rare in the automotive industry, where companies typically outsource 80% of components to suppliers and focus on engine manufacturing and final assembly. Tesla used low-cost strategy as a business approach, with which they can expand their business into a broader market by offering standard technology items.

Tesla generally allows its competitors to license its technology, stating that it wants to help its competitors accelerate the world's use of sustainable energy. Licensing agreements include provisions whereby the recipient agrees not to file patent suits against Tesla, or to copy its designs directly. Tesla retains control of its other intellectual property, such as trademarks and trade secrets to prevent direct copying of its technology.

Technology 
Tesla develops many components in-house, such as batteries, motors, and software.

Vehicle batteries 

Tesla was the first automaker to use batteries containing thousands of small, cylindrical, lithium-ion commodity cells like those used in consumer electronics. Tesla uses a version of these cells that is designed to be cheaper to manufacture and lighter than standard cells by removing some safety features; according to Tesla, these features are redundant because of the advanced thermal management system and an intumescent chemical in the battery to prevent fires.

The batteries are placed under the vehicle floor. This saves interior and trunk (boot) space but increases the risk of battery damage by debris or impact (see crashes and fires). After two vehicle fires in 2013 due to road debris, the Model S was retrofitted with a multi-part aluminum and titanium protection system to reduce the possibility of damage.

In 2016, former Tesla CTO J.B. Straubel expected batteries to last 10–15 years, and discounted using electric cars to charge the grid with vehicle-to-grid because the related battery wear outweighs economic benefit. He also preferred recycling over re-use for grid once they reach the end of their useful life for vehicles. Tesla launched its battery recycling operation at Giga Nevada in 2019. Straubel independently founded battery recycling company Redwood Materials in 2017, which supplies recycled materials to Panasonic.

Panasonic is Tesla's supplier of cells in the United States, and cooperates with Tesla in producing cylindrical 2170 batteries at Giga Nevada.
In January 2021, Panasonic had the capacity to produce 39 GWh per year of batteries at Giga Nevada. Tesla's battery cells used in Giga Shanghai are supplied by Panasonic and Contemporary Amperex Technology (CATL), and are the more traditional prismatic (rectangular) cells used by other automakers.
, nearly half of all Tesla's vehicles produced last quarter are using cobalt-free Lithium iron phosphate battery (LFP) made in China.

Battery research 
Tesla invests in lithium-ion battery research. Starting in 2016, the company established a 5-year battery research and development partnership at Dalhousie University in Nova Scotia, Canada, with lead researcher Jeff Dahn. Tesla acquired two battery companies: Maxwell Technologies, acquired for over $200 million – but sold in 2021 and Hibar Systems.

During Tesla's Battery Day event on September 22, 2020, Tesla announced the next generation of batteries, featuring a tab-less battery design to increase the range and decrease the price of Tesla vehicles. Two weeks before Battery Day, Tesla paid a total of $3 to buy several battery manufacturing patent applications from Springpower International, a small Canadian battery company.

Tesla predicted the new batteries could be up to 56% cheaper and allow the cars to have a 54% longer range. The company said this would be achieved by a more efficient production process, new battery design, cheaper resources for the anode and cathode, and better integration into the vehicle. Business analysis company BloombergNEF estimated Tesla's battery pack price in 2021 at $112 per kWh, versus an industry average of $132 per kWh. , BloombergNEF estimates the industry as a whole will reach $100 per kWh in 2024. The United States Department of Energy estimated in 2020 that battery prices of about $100 per kWh would cause electric cars to reach cost parity with their gasoline-powered counterparts, which in turn would accelerate sales of new electric cars.

Motors 
Tesla makes two kinds of electric motors. Its oldest design in production is a three-phase four-pole alternating current induction motor with a copper rotor (which inspired the Tesla logo), which is used as the rear motor in the Model S and Model X. Newer, higher-efficiency permanent magnet motors are used in the Model 3, Model Y, the front motor of 2019-onward versions of the Model S and X, and are expected to be used in the Tesla Semi. The permanent magnet motors increase efficiency, especially in stop-start driving.

Autopilot 

Autopilot is an advanced driver-assistance system developed by Tesla. The system requires active driver supervision at all times.

Since September 2014, all Tesla cars are shipped with sensors (initially hardware version 1 or "HW1") and software to support Autopilot. Tesla upgraded its sensors and software in October 2016 ("HW2") to support full self-driving in the future. HW2 includes eight cameras, twelve ultrasonic sensors, and forward-facing radar. HW2.5 was released in mid-2017, and it upgraded HW2 with a second graphics processing unit (GPU) and, for the Model 3 only, a driver-facing camera. HW3 was released in early 2019 with an updated and more powerful computer, employing a custom Tesla-designed system on a chip.

In April 2019, Tesla announced that all of its cars will include Autopilot software (defined as just Traffic-Aware Cruise Control and Autosteer (Beta)) as a standard feature moving forward. Full self-driving software (Autopark, Navigate on Autopilot (Beta), Auto Lane Change (Beta), Summon (Beta), Smart Summon (Beta) and future abilities) is an extra cost option.

In 2020, Tesla released software updates where its cars recognize and automatically stop at stop signs and traffic lights. In May 2021, Tesla removed the radar sensor and radar features from its Model 3 and Model Y vehicles, opting instead to rely on camera vision alone. The New York Times reported in December 2021 that Musk "repeatedly told members of the Autopilot team that humans could drive with only two eyes and that this meant cars should be able to drive with cameras alone," an analogy some experts and former Tesla engineers described as "deeply flawed." Similarly, a statistical analysis conducted in A Methodology for Normalizing Safety Statistics of Partially Automated Vehicles debunked a common Tesla claim that Autopilot reduced crash rates by 40 percent by accounting for the relative safety of the given operating domain when using active safety measures.

Full Self-Driving 

Full Self-Driving (FSD) is an optional extension of Autopilot promoted as eventually being able to perform fully autonomous driving. At the end of 2016, Tesla expected to demonstrate full autonomy by the end of 2017, which  has not occurred. The first beta version of the software was released on October 22, 2020, to a small group of testers. The release of the beta has renewed concern regarding whether the technology is ready for testing on public roads. The National Transportation Safety Board (NTSB) has called for "tougher requirements" for any testing of Autopilot on public roads.

Tesla's approach to achieve full autonomy is different from that of other companies. Whereas Waymo, Cruise, and other companies are relying on highly detailed (centimeter-scale) three-dimensional maps, lidar, and cameras, as well as radar and ultrasonic sensors in their autonomous vehicles, Tesla's approach is to use coarse-grained two-dimensional maps and cameras (no lidar) as well as radar and ultrasonic sensors. Tesla claims that although its approach is much more difficult, it will ultimately be more useful, because its vehicles will be able to self-drive without geofencing concerns. Tesla's self-driving software has been trained on over 20 billion miles driven by Tesla vehicles as of January 2021. Tesla also designed a self-driving computer chip that has been installed in its cars since March 2019.

Most experts believe that Tesla's approach of trying to achieve full self-driving by eschewing lidar and high-definition maps is not feasible. In March 2021, according to a letter that Tesla sent to the California Department of Motor Vehicles about FSD's capability – acquired by PlainSite via a public records request – Tesla stated that FSD is not capable of autonomous driving and is only at Society of Automotive Engineers Level 2 automation. In a May 2021 study by Guidehouse Insights, Tesla was ranked last for both strategy and execution in the autonomous driving sector. In October 2021, the National Transportation Safety Board (NTSB) called on Tesla to change the design of its Autopilot to ensure it cannot be misused by drivers, according to a letter sent to Musk.

Assembly technology 
Tesla has pioneered the use of massive casting machines (Giga Press), to make large single pieces of vehicle underbodies and to streamline production.

In September 2022, Tesla revealed prototypes of its proposed humanoid robot Optimus, which Musk has stated uses the same core software as FSD. During the presentations at Tesla's AI Day 2022, Musk suggested that, among other use cases, the finalized version of Optimus could be used in Tesla's car factories to help with repetitive tasks and relieve labor shortages.

Glass 
In November 2016, the company announced the Tesla glass technology group. The group produced the roof glass for the Tesla Model 3. It also produces the glass used in the Tesla Solar Roof's solar shingles.

Facilities 

The company operates six large factories. The company also operates showrooms and galleries around the world.

United States 

Tesla was founded in San Carlos, California. In 2010, Tesla moved its corporate headquarters and opened a powertrain development facility in Palo Alto.

Tesla's first retail store was opened in 2008 in Los Angeles, followed by others in major U.S. cities. , Tesla operates 196 stores and galleries in the United States, has stores and galleries in 34 other countries, and has 655 service centers globally.

Tesla's first assembly plant occupies the former NUMMI plant in Fremont, California, known as the Tesla Fremont Factory. The factory was originally opened by General Motors in 1962, and then operated by a joint venture of GM and Toyota from 1984. The original factory was closed in 2010, and was acquired by Tesla the same year.

The first major battery production facility was opened in Nevada in 2016. Gigafactory Nevada (originally Gigafactory 1) produces Powerwalls, Powerpacks and Megapacks; battery cells in partnership with Panasonic; and Model 3 battery packs and drivetrains. The factory received substantial subsidies from the local and state government, that, in exchange for opening in their jurisdiction, allowed Tesla to operate essentially tax free for 10 years.

As part of the acquisition of SolarCity in 2016, Tesla acquired Gigafactory New York located in Buffalo, New York, on the site of a former Republic Steel plant. SolarCity had received incentives to locate its factory in Buffalo through the Buffalo Billion program. In 2017, the factory started production of solar shingles for the Tesla Solar Roof. Between 2017 and 2020 Tesla partnered with Panasonic to assemble photovoltaic modules at the plant.

In May 2020, after Alameda County had refused to let the Tesla factory reopen after a COVID-19 lockdown, Elon Musk threatened that he would move the company's headquarters from California to Texas or Nevada.

On July 23, 2020, Tesla picked Austin, Texas, as the site of Gigafactory 5, since then known as Gigafactory Texas Giga Texas is planned to be the main factory for the Tesla Cybertruck and the Tesla Semi; it will also produce Model 3 and Model Y cars for the Eastern United States. On April 7, 2022, Tesla celebrated the public opening of the Giga Texas facility with its Cyber Rodeo event attended by an estimated 15,000 invitees.

On December 1, 2021, Tesla officially relocated its headquarters to the Gigafactory site in Austin, Texas. Because of Texas regulations, the company offers to cover costs for out-of-state healthcare, which include abortion and gender affirmation procedures.

Tesla acquired a former JC Penney distribution center near Lathrop, California, in 2021 to build a Megafactory to manufacture Megapacks. The location opened in 2022 and produces the next-generation Megapacks to use prismatic lithium iron phosphate batteries.

Europe 

Tesla opened its first European store in June 2009 in London. Tesla's European headquarters are in the Netherlands. Tesla operates facilities in Tilburg, including a  European Distribution Centre and an  final assembly facility that adds drivetrain, battery and software to imported car bodies to reduce import tax, which depends on the location of final assembly.

In late 2016, Tesla acquired German engineering firm Grohmann Engineering as a new division dedicated to helping Tesla increase the automation and effectiveness of its manufacturing process. After winding down existing contracts with other auto manufacturers, the renamed Tesla Grohmann Automation now works exclusively on Tesla projects.

Tesla announced its plans to build a car and battery factory in Europe in 2016. Several countries campaigned to be the host, and eventually Germany was chosen in November 2019. On March 22, 2022, Tesla's first European Gigafactory named Gigafactory Berlin-Brandenburg opened with planned capacity to produce 500,000 electric vehicles annually as well as batteries for the cars.

Asia 

Tesla opened its first Japanese showroom in Tokyo, Japan, in October 2010. By 2013, showrooms and service centers were operating in Hong Kong, Beijing and Shanghai. Two showrooms opened in South Korea in March 2017 and a service center opened there in late 2017. In August 2017, Taiwan opened its first service center and showroom.

In July 2018, Tesla signed an agreement with Chinese authorities to build a factory in Shanghai, China, which was Tesla's first Gigafactory outside of the United States. The factory building was finished in August 2019, and the initial Tesla Model 3s were in production from Giga Shanghai in October 2019.

In response to the Chinese military banning Tesla cars from entering military housing complexes, Elon Musk stated during the China Development Forum in March 2021 that the company would stop producing cars in the country if cars were being used to spy. The comment came shortly after a meeting of Chinese and U.S. diplomats in Alaska, in part over concerns of U.S. intervention in China's internal affairs.

In 2021, China accounted for 26% of Tesla sales revenue, and was the second largest market for Tesla after the United States, which accounted for 45% of its sales.

Rest of the world 
Tesla opened the first Australian showroom in Sydney in 2010, followed by a showroom and service center in Melbourne in 2015. By 2019, Tesla had opened 4 service centers in Australia. In 2012, Tesla opened its first store in Canada in Toronto.

The first expansion of Tesla in the Middle East was with the opening of a showroom and a service center in Dubai, United Arab Emirates (UAE), in 2017. Five ultra-fast superchargers were also built between cities in the UAE, with a planned 50 destination chargers by the end of 2017. One of the first Tesla customers was Dubai's Roads and Transport Authority which ordered 200 Tesla Model S and Model X vehicles that were added to Dubai Taxi Corporation's fleet. In May 2017, a service center and store in Amman, Jordan was opened. In January 2020 a "pop-up" store in Tel Aviv, Israel was opened as well as a research and development center.

Partners

Panasonic 

In January 2010, Tesla and battery cell maker Panasonic announced that they would together develop nickel-based lithium-ion battery cells for electric vehicles. The partnership was part of Panasonic's $1 billion investment over three years in facilities for lithium-ion cell research, development and production.

Beginning in 2010, Panasonic invested $30 million for a multi-year collaboration on new battery cells designed specifically for electric vehicles. In July 2014, Panasonic reached a basic agreement with Tesla to participate in battery production at Giga Nevada.

Tesla and Panasonic also collaborated on the manufacturing and production of photovoltaic (PV) cells and modules at the Giga New York factory in Buffalo, New York. The partnership started in mid-2017 and ended in early 2020, before Panasonic exited the solar business entirely in January 2021.

In March 2021, the outgoing CEO of Panasonic stated that the company plans to reduce its reliance on Tesla as their battery partnership evolves.

Other current partners 
Tesla has long-term contracts in place for lithium supply. In September 2020, Tesla signed a sales agreement with Piedmont Lithium to buy high-purity lithium ore for up to ten years, specifically to supply "spodumene concentrate from Piedmont's North Carolina mineral deposit". In 2022, Tesla contracted for 110,000 tonnes of spodumene concentrate over four years from the Core Lithium's lithium mine in the Northern Territory of Australia.

Tesla also has a range of minor partnerships, for instance working with Airbnb and hotel chains to install destination chargers at selected locations.

Former partners

Daimler AG 

Daimler AG and Tesla began working together in late 2007. On May 19, 2009, Daimler bought a stake of less than 10% in Tesla for a reported $50 million. As part of the collaboration, Herbert Kohler, vice-president of E-Drive and Future Mobility at Daimler, took a Tesla board seat. On July 13, 2009, Daimler AG sold 40% of its acquisition to Aabar. Aabar is an investment company controlled by the International Petroleum Investment Company (IPIC), which is owned by the government of Abu Dhabi. In October 2014, Daimler sold its remaining holdings for a reported $780 million.

Tesla supplied battery packs for Freightliner Trucks' Custom Chassis electric van in 2010. The company also built electric-powertrain components for the Mercedes-Benz A-Class E-Cell, with 500 cars planned to be built for trial in Europe beginning in September 2011.

Tesla produced and co-developed the Mercedes-Benz B250e's powertrain, which ended production in 2017. Daimler division Smart produced the Smart ED2 cars from 2009 to 2012 which had a  lithium-ion battery from Tesla.

Toyota 

In May 2010, Tesla and Toyota announced a deal in which Tesla purchased the former NUMMI factory from Toyota for $42 million, Toyota purchased $50 million in Tesla stock, and the two companies collaborated on an electric vehicle.

In July 2010, the companies announced they would work together on a second generation Toyota RAV4 EV. The vehicle was unveiled at the October 2010 Los Angeles Auto Show and 35 pilot vehicles were built for a demonstration and evaluation program that ran through 2011. Tesla supplied the lithium metal-oxide battery and other powertrain components based on components from the Roadster.

The production version was unveiled in August 2012, using battery pack, electronics and powertrain components from the Tesla Model S sedan (also launched in 2012). The RAV4 EV had a limited production run which resulted in just under 3,000 vehicles being produced, before it was discontinued in 2014.

According to Bloomberg News, the partnership between Tesla and Toyota was "marred by clashes between engineers". Toyota engineers rejected designs that Tesla had proposed for an enclosure to protect the RAV4 EV's battery pack. Toyota took over responsibility for the enclosure's design and strengthened it. In 2014, Tesla ended up adding a titanium plate to protect the Model S sedan's battery after some debris-related crashes lead to cars catching fire. On June 5, 2017, Toyota announced that it had sold all of its shares in Tesla and halted the partnership.

Mobileye 

Initial versions of Autopilot were developed in partnership with Mobileye beginning in 2014. Mobileye ended the partnership on July 26, 2016, citing "disagreements about how the technology was deployed."

Lawsuits and controversies

Sexual harassment 
In 2021, seven women came forward with claims of having faced sexual harassment and discrimination while working at Tesla's Fremont factory. They accused the company of facilitating a culture of rampant sexual harassment. The women said they were consistently subjected to catcalling, unwanted advances, unwanted touching, and discrimination while at work. "I was so tired of the unwanted attention and the males gawking at me I proceeded to create barriers around me just so I could get some relief," Brooks told The Washington Post. "That was something I felt necessary just so I can do my job." Stories range from intimate groping to being called out to the parking lot for sex.

Women feared calling HR for help as their supervisors were often participants. Musk himself is not indicted, but most of the women pressing charges believe their abuse is connected to the behavior of CEO Elon Musk. They cite his crude remarks about women's bodies, wisecracks about starting a university that abbreviated to "T.IT.S", and his generally dismissive attitude towards reporting sexual harassment. "What we're addressing for each of the lawsuits is just a shocking pattern of rampant harassment that exists at Tesla," said attorney David A. Lowe. In 2017, another woman had accused Tesla of very similar behavior and was subsequently fired. In a statement to the Guardian, Tesla confirmed the company had fired her, saying it had thoroughly investigated the employee's allegations with the help of "a neutral, third-party expert" and concluded her complaints were unmerited.

In May 2022, a California judge ruled that the sexual harassment lawsuit could move to court, rejecting Tesla's request for closed-door arbitration.

Labor disputes 

In June 2016, the National Highway Traffic Safety Administration (NHTSA) took issue with Tesla's use of nondisclosure agreements (NDAs) regarding customer repairs and, in October 2021, the NHTSA formally asked Tesla to explain its NDA policy regarding customers invited into the FSD Beta. Tesla has used NDAs on multiple occasions with both employees and customers to allegedly prevent possible negative coverage.

From 2014 to 2018, Tesla's Fremont Factory had three times as many Occupational Safety and Health Administration (OSHA) violations as the ten largest U.S. auto plants combined. An investigation by the Reveal podcast alleged that Tesla "failed to report some of its serious injuries on legally mandated reports" to downplay the extent of injuries.

In January 2019, former Tesla security manager Sean Gouthro filed a whistleblower complaint alleging that the company had hacked employees' phones and spied on them, while also failing to report illegal activities to the authorities and shareholders. Several legal cases have revolved around alleged whistleblower retaliation by Tesla. These include the dismissal of Tesla safety official Carlos Ramirez and Tesla security employee Karl Hansen. In 2020, the court ordered Hansen's case to arbitration. In June 2022, the arbitrator filed an unopposed motion with the court stating Hansen "has failed to establish the claims...Accordingly his claims are denied, and he shall take nothing".

In September 2019, a California judge ruled that 12 actions in 2017 and 2018 by Musk and other Tesla executives violated labor laws because they sabotaged employee attempts to unionize.

In March 2021, the US National Labor Relations Board ordered Musk to remove a tweet and reinstate a fired employee over union organization activities.

Fraud 
There have been numerous concerns about Tesla's financial reporting. In 2013, Bloomberg News questioned whether Tesla's financial reporting violated Generally Accepted Accounting Principles (GAAP) reporting standards. Fortune accused Tesla in 2016 of using creative accounting to show positive cash flow and quarterly profits. In 2018, analysts expressed concerns over Tesla's accounts receivable balance. In September 2019, the SEC questioned Tesla CFO Zach Kirkhorn about Tesla's warranty reserves and lease accounting. Hedge fund manager David Einhorn accused Elon Musk in November 2019 of "significant fraud", and publicly questioned Tesla's accounting practices, telling Musk that he was "beginning to wonder whether your accounts receivable exist."

From 2012 to 2014, Tesla earned more than $295 million in Zero Emission Vehicle credits for a battery-swapping technology that was never made available to customers. Staff at California Air Resources Board were concerned that Tesla was "gaming" the battery swap subsidies and in 2013 recommended eliminating the credits.

A consolidated shareholders lawsuit alleges that Musk knew SolarCity was going broke before the acquisition, that he and the Tesla board overpaid for SolarCity, ignored their conflicts of interest and breached their fiduciary duties in connection with the deal, and failed to disclose "troubling facts" essential to an analysis of the proposed acquisition. The members of the board settled in 2020, leaving Musk as the only defendant. In April 2022, a Delaware court ruled in favor of defendant Elon Musk in a shareholder lawsuit over Tesla's $2.6 billion acquisition of SolarCity.

In August 2018, Elon Musk tweeted, "Am considering taking Tesla private at $420. Funding secured." The tweet caused the stock to initially rise but then drop when it was revealed to be false. Musk settled fraud charges with the U.S. Securities and Exchange Commission (SEC) over his false statements in September 2018. According to the terms of the settlement, Musk agreed to have his tweets reviewed by Tesla's in-house counsel, he was removed from his chairman role at Tesla temporarily, and two new independent directors were appointed to the company's board. Tesla and Musk also paid civil penalties of $20 million each. A civil class-action shareholder lawsuit over Musk's statements and other derivative lawsuits were also filed against Musk and the members of Tesla's board of directors, as then constituted, in regard to claims and actions made that were associated with potentially going private. In February 2023, a California jury unanimously found Musk and Tesla not liable in the class-action lawsuit.

In September 2018, Tesla disclosed that it was under investigation by the U.S. Federal Bureau of Investigation (FBI) regarding its Model 3 production figures. Authorities were investigating whether the company misled investors and made projections about its Model 3 production that it knew would be impossible to meet. A stockholder class action lawsuit against Tesla related to Model 3 production numbers (unrelated to the FBI investigation) was dismissed in March 2019.

Tesla US dealership disputes 

Unlike other automakers, Tesla does not rely on franchised auto dealerships to sell vehicles and instead directly sells vehicles through its website and a network of company-owned stores. In some areas, Tesla operates locations called "galleries" which "educate and inform customers about our products, but such locations do not actually transact in the sale of vehicles." This is because some jurisdictions, particularly in the United States, prohibit auto manufacturers from directly selling vehicles to consumers. Dealership associations have filed lawsuits to prevent direct sales. These associations argued that the franchise system protects consumers by encouraging dealers to compete with each other, lowering the price a customer pays. They also claimed that direct sales would allow manufacturers to undersell their own dealers. The United States Federal Trade Commission ultimately disproved the associations' claims and recommended allowing direct manufacturer sale, which they concluded would save consumers 8% in average vehicle price.

Tesla has also lobbied state governments for the right to directly sell cars. The company has argued that directly operating stores improves consumer education about electric vehicles, because dealerships would sell both Tesla and gas-powered vehicles. Doing this, according to the company, would then set up a conflict of interest for the dealers since properly advertising the benefits of an electric car would disparage the gas-powered vehicles, creating a disincentive to dealership EV sales. Musk himself further contended that dealers would have a disincentive to sell electric vehicles because they require less maintenance and therefore would reduce after-sales service revenue, a large profit center for most dealerships.

Intellectual property 
In January 2021, Tesla filed a lawsuit against Alex Khatilov alleging that the former employee stole company information by downloading files related to its Warp Drive software to his personal Dropbox account. Khatilov denies the allegation that he was acting as a "willful and malicious thief" and attributes his actions to an accidental data transfer. The case was settled in August 2021 through mediation.

Tesla has sued former employees in the past for similar actions; for example, Guangzhi Cao, a Tesla engineer, was accused of uploading Tesla Autopilot source code to his iCloud account; Tesla and Cao settled in April 2021.

Defamation 
In January 2022, Tesla's China division announced that it was taking legal action against Xiaogang Xuezhang, a Douyin (TikTok) user with over 14 million followers on the platform. The lawsuit arose after Xiaogang posted two videos on Douyin in April 2021, in which he tested the automated emergency braking (AEB) systems of a Tesla Model 3 and an XPeng P7. In the videos, Xiaogang said the Model 3's AEB system failed to activate two out of three times, leading to collisions. Tesla claimed the data was fabricated and tarnished the brand's reputation among consumers.

Misappropriation 
In 2018, a class action was filed against Musk and the members of Tesla's board alleging they breached their fiduciary duties by approving Musk's stock-based compensation plan. Musk received the first portion of his stock options payout, worth more than $700 million in May 2020.

Environmental violations 
In 2019, The United States Environmental Protection Agency fined Tesla for hazardous waste violations that occurred in 2017. In June 2019, Tesla began negotiating penalties for 19 environmental violations from the Bay Area Air Quality Management District; the violations took place around Tesla Fremont's paint shop, where there had been at least four fires between 2014 and 2019. Environmental violations and permit deviations at Tesla's Fremont Factory increased from 2018 to 2019 with the production ramp of the Model 3.

In June 2018, Tesla employee Martin Tripp leaked information that Tesla was scrapping or reworking up to 40% of its raw materials at the Nevada Gigafactory. After Tesla fired him for the leak, Tripp filed a lawsuit and claimed Tesla's security team gave police a false tip that he was planning a mass shooting at the Nevada factory. The court ruled in Tesla's favor on September 17, 2020.

Property damage 
In August 2019, Walmart filed a multi-million dollar lawsuit against Tesla, claiming that Tesla's "negligent installation and maintenance" of solar panels caused roof fires at seven Walmart stores dating back to 2012. Walmart reached a settlement with Tesla in November 2019; the terms of the settlement were not disclosed.

In May 2021, a Norwegian judge found Tesla guilty of throttling charging speed through a 2019 over-the-air software update, awarding each of the 30 customers who were part of the lawsuit 136,000 Norwegian kroner ($16,000). Approximately 10,000 other Norwegian Tesla owners may be granted a similar award.

Racism 
Tesla has faced numerous complaints regarding workplace harassment and racial discrimination, with one former Tesla worker who attempted to sue the employer describing it as "a hotbed of racist behavior". As of December 2021, three percent of leadership at the company are African American. A former black worker described the work environment at Tesla's Buffalo plant as a "very racist place". Tesla and SpaceX's treatment of Juneteenth in 2020 also came under fire. Approximately 100 former employees have submitted signed statements alleging that Tesla discriminates specifically against African Americans and "allows a racist environment in its factories." According to the state's Department of Fair Employment and Housing, the Fremont factory is a racially segregated place where Black employees claim they are given the most menial and physically demanding work. The accusations of racism culminated in February 2022 with the California Department of Fair Employment and Housing suing Tesla for "discriminating against its Black workers."

In July 2021, former employee Melvin Berry received $1 million in his discrimination case in arbitration against Tesla after he claimed he was referred to by the n-word and forced to work longer hours at the Fremont plant.

In October 2021, a jury verdict in the Owen Diaz vs. Tesla trial awarded the plaintiff $137 million in damages after he had faced racial harassment at Tesla's Fremont facility during 2015–2016. In a blog, Tesla stressed that Diaz was never "really" a Tesla worker, and that most utterings of the n-word were expressed in a friendly manner. In April 2022, federal judge William Orrick upheld the jury finding of Tesla's liability but reduced the total damage down to $15 million. Diaz was given a two-week deadline to decide if he would collect the damages. In June 2022, Diaz announced that he would be rejecting the $15 million award, opening the door for a new trial.

Few of these cases against Tesla ever make it to trial as most employees are made to sign arbitration agreements. Employees are afterwards required to resolve such disputes out of court, and behind closed doors.

Conduct during the COVID-19 pandemic 
Tesla's initial response to the COVID-19 pandemic in the United States has been the subject of considerable criticism. Musk had sought to exempt the Tesla Fremont factory in Alameda County, California from the government's stay-at-home orders. In an earnings call in April, he was heard calling the public health orders "fascist". He had also called the public's response to the pandemic "dumb" and had said online that there would be zero cases by April. In May 2020, while Alameda County officials were negotiating with the company to reopen the Fremont Factory on the 18th, Musk defied local government orders by restarting production on the 11th. Tesla also sued Alameda County, questioning the legality of the orders, but backed down after the Fremont Factory was given approval to reopen. Tesla published a detailed plan for bringing employees back to work and keeping them safe, however some employees continued to express concern for their health.

In May 2020, Musk told workers that they could stay home if they felt uncomfortable coming back to work. But in June, Tesla fired an employee who criticized the company for taking inadequate safety measures to protect workers from the coronavirus at the Fremont Factory. Three more employees at Tesla's Fremont Factory claimed they were fired for staying home out of fear of catching COVID-19. This was subsequently denied by Tesla, which even stated that the employees were still on the payroll. COVID-19 cases at the factory grew from 10 in May 2020 to 125 in December 2020, with about 450 total cases in that time period out of the approximately 10,000 workers at the plant (4.5%).

In China, Tesla had what one Tesla executive described as "not a green light from the government to get back to workbut a flashing-sirens police escort." Tesla enjoyed special treatment and strong government support in China, including tax breaks, cheap financing, and assistance in building its Giga Shanghai factory at breakneck speeds. Musk has praised China's way of doing things, a controversial stance due to deteriorating U.S.–Chinese relations, China's ongoing persecution of Uyghurs, and alleged human rights abuses in Hong Kong.

Criticism

Delays 
Musk has been criticized for repeated pushing out both production and release dates of products. By one count in 2016, Musk had missed 20 projections. In October 2017, Musk predicted that Model 3 production would be 5,000 units per week by December. A month later, he revised that target to "sometime in March" 2018. Delivery dates for the Model 3 were delayed as well. Other projects like converting supercharger stations to be solar-powered have also lagged projections. Musk responded in late 2018: "punctuality is not my strong suit...I never made a mass-produced car. How am I supposed to know with precision when it's gonna get done?"

Giga New York audit 
In 2020, the New York State Comptroller released an audit of the Giga New York factory project, concluding that it presented many red flags, including lack of basic due diligence and that the factory itself produced only $0.54 in economic benefits for every $1 spent by the state.

Tesla's mission 
According to automotive journalist Jamie Kitman, when multiple CEOs of major automotive manufacturers approached Tesla for EV technology that Musk had claimed the company was willing to share, they instead were offered the opportunity to buy regulatory credits from Tesla. This suggested, according to Kitman, that "the company may not be as eager for the electric revolution to occur as it claims."

Short-sellers and TSLAQ 
TSLAQ is a collective of Tesla critics and short sellers who aim to "shape [the] perception [of Tesla] and move its stock." In January 2020, 20% of Tesla stock was shorted, the highest at that time of any stock in the U.S. equity markets. By early 2021, according to CNN, short sellers had lost $40 billion during 2020 as the stock price climbed much higher. Michael Burry, a short seller portrayed in The Big Short, had shorted Tesla previously via his firm Scion Asset Management, but removed his position in October 2021.

Vehicle product issues

Recalls 
On April 20, 2017, Tesla issued a worldwide recall of 53,000 (~70%) of the 76,000 vehicles it sold in 2016 due to faulty parking brakes which could become stuck and "prevent the vehicles from moving". On March 29, 2018, Tesla issued a worldwide recall of 123,000 Model S cars built before April 2016 due to corrosion-susceptible power steering bolts, which could fail and require the driver to use "increased force" to control the vehicle.

In October 2020, Tesla initiated a recall of nearly 50,000 Model X and Y vehicles throughout China for suspension issues. Soon after in November, the NHTSA announced it had opened its own investigation into 115,000 Tesla cars regarding "front suspension safety issues", citing specifically 2015–2017 Model S and 2016–2017 Model X years. Cases of the "whompy wheel" phenomenon, which also included Model X and the occasional Model 3 cars, have been documented through 2020.

In February 2021, Tesla was required by the NHTSA to recall 135,000 Model S and Model X vehicles built from 2012 to 2018 due to using a flash memory device that was rated to last only 5 to 6 years. The problem was related to touchscreen failures that could possibly affect the rear-view camera, safety systems, Autopilot and other features. The underlying technical reason is that the car writes a large amount of syslog content to the device, wearing it out prematurely.

Also in February 2021, the German Federal Motor Transport Authority (KBA) ordered Tesla to recall 12,300 Model X cars because of "body mouldings problems".

In June 2021, Tesla recalled 5,974 electric vehicles due to worries that brake caliper bolts might become loose, which could lead to loss of tire pressure, potentially increasing the chance of a crash.

On December 30, 2021, Tesla announced that they are recalling more than 475,000 US model vehicles. This included 356,309 Model 3 Tesla vehicles from 2017 to 2020 due to rear-view camera issues and a further 119,009 Tesla Model S vehicles due to potential problems with the trunk or boot. The Model S recall includes vehicles manufactured between 2014 and 2021. Around 1% of recalled Model 3s may have a defective rear-view camera, and around 14% of recalled model S's may have the defect. The recall was not linked to a contemporaneous issue regarding the Passenger Play feature, which allowed games to be played on the touchscreen while the car is in motion. After an investigation was launched by the NHTSA covering 585,000 vehicles, Tesla agreed to make changes where the feature would be locked and unusable while the car is moving.

In September 2022, Tesla announced that they are recalling almost 1.1 million US model vehicles because the automatic window reversal system might not react correctly after detecting an obstruction, increasing the risk of injury. In response, Tesla announced an over-the-air software fix.

In February 2023, Tesla recalled its FSD software following a recommendation from NHTSA; the recall applied to approximately 360,000 cars.  NHTSA found that FSD caused "unreasonable risk" when used on city streets. In March 2023, about 3,500 Model Y Teslas were recalled for a bolting issue concerning the cars' second-row seats.

Fires and Autopilot crashes 

Tesla customers have reported the company as being "slow" to address how their cars can ignite. In 2013, a Model S caught fire after the vehicle hit metal debris on a highway in Kent, Washington. Tesla confirmed the fire began in the battery pack and was caused by the impact of an object. As a result of this and other incidents, Tesla announced its decision to extend its current vehicle warranty to cover fire damage. In March 2014, the NHTSA announced that it had closed the investigation into whether the Model S was prone to catch fire, after Tesla said it would provide more protection to its battery packs. All Model S cars manufactured after March 6, 2014, have had the  aluminum shield over the battery pack replaced with a new three-layer shield. In October 2019, the NHTSA opened an investigation into possible battery defects in Tesla's Model S and X vehicles from 2012 to 2019 that could cause "non-crash" fires.

A Model S driver died in a collision with a tractor-trailer in 2016, while the vehicle was in Autopilot mode; the driver is believed to be the first person to have died in a Tesla vehicle in Autopilot. The NHTSA investigated the accident but found no safety-related defect trend. In March 2018, a driver of a Tesla Model X was killed in a crash. Investigators say that the driver of the vehicle had his car in 'self-driving' mode and was using his phone to play games when the vehicle collided with the barrier in the middle of the freeway. Through investigation, the NTSB found that the Tesla malfunctioned due to the system being confused by an exit on the freeway.

According to a document released in June 2021, the NHTSA has initiated at least 30 investigations into Tesla crashes that were believed to involve the use of Autopilot, with some involving fatalities. In early September 2021, the NHTSA updated the list with an additional fatality incident and ordered Tesla to hand over all extensive data pertaining to US cars with Autopilot to determine if there is a safety defect that leads Tesla cars to collide with first-responder vehicles. In late September 2021, Tesla released an over-the-air software update to detect emergency lights at night. In October 2021, the NHTSA asked Tesla why it did not issue a recall when it sent out that update. In June 2022, the NHTSA said it would expand its probe, extending it to 830,000 cars from all current Tesla models. The probe will be moved up from the Preliminary Evaluation level to the Engineering Analysis one. The regulator cited the reason for the expansion as the need to "explore the degree to which Autopilot and associated Tesla systems may exacerbate human factors or behavioral safety risks by undermining the effectiveness of the driver's supervision."

A safety test conducted by the Dawn Project in August 2022 demonstrated that a test driver using the beta version of Full Self-Driving repeatedly hit a child-sized mannequin in its path, but there has been controversy over its conclusions. Several Tesla fans responded by conducting their own, independent tests using children; NHTSA released a statement warning against the practice.

Software hacking 
In August 2015, two researchers said they were able to take control of a Tesla Model S by hacking into the car's entertainment system. The hack required the researchers to physically access the car. Tesla issued a security update for the Model S the day after the exploit was announced.

In September 2016, researchers at Tencent's Keen Security Lab demonstrated a remote attack on a Tesla Model S and controlled the vehicle in both Parking and Driving Mode without physical access. They were able to compromise the automotive networking bus (CAN bus) when the vehicle's web browser was used while the vehicle was connected to a malicious Wi-Fi hotspot. This was the first case of a remote control exploit demonstrated on a Tesla. The vulnerability was disclosed to Tesla under their bug bounty program and patched within 10 days, before the exploit was made public. Tencent also hacked the doors of a Model X in 2017.

In January 2018, security researchers informed Tesla that an Amazon Web Services account of theirs could be accessed directly from the Internet and that the account had been exploited for cryptocurrency mining. Tesla responded by securing the compromised system, rewarding the security researchers financially via their bug bounty program, and stating that the compromise did not violate customer privacy, nor vehicle safety or security. Later in 2019, Tesla awarded a car and $375,000 to ethical hackers during a Pwn2Own Model 3 hacking event.

In June 2022, Martin Herfurt, a security researcher in Austria, discovered that changes made to make Tesla vehicles easier to start with NFC cards also allowed for pairing new keys to the vehicle, allowing an attacker to enroll their own keys to a vehicle.

Phantom braking 
Tesla drivers have reported a surge in "phantom braking" events when using Tesla Autopilot which coincides with the automaker's removal of radar as a supplemental sensor. In response, NHTSA has opened an investigation.

Vehicle sales 
In 2021, Tesla ranked as the world's bestselling plug-in and battery electric passenger car manufacturer, with a market share of 14% of the plug-in segment and 21% of the battery electric segment sales. Tesla reported 2022 vehicle deliveries of 1,313,851 units, up 40% from 2021. At the end of 2021, Tesla's global sales since 2012 totaled 2.3 million units.

Production and sales by quarter 

Tesla deliveries vary significantly by month due to regional issues such as availability of car carriers and registration. On March 9, 2020, the company produced its 1 millionth electric car, becoming the first auto manufacturer to achieve such a milestone. In the third quarter of 2021, Tesla sold its 2 millionth electric car, becoming the first auto manufacturer to achieve such a milestone.

Finances 

For the fiscal (and calendar) year 2021, Tesla reported a net income of $5.52 billion. The annual revenue was $53.8 billion, an increase of 71% over the previous fiscal year.

Of the revenue number in 2021, $314 million came from selling regulatory credits to other automakers to meet government pollution standards. That number has been a smaller percentage of revenue for multiple quarters. In Q1 2022, Tesla sold $679 million of regulatory carbon credits.

Tesla ended 2021 with $17.6 billion of cash on hand, down $1.8 billion from the end of 2020.

In February 2021, a 10-K filing revealed that Tesla had invested some $1.5 billion in the cryptocurrency Bitcoin, and the company indicated it would soon accept Bitcoin as a form of payment. Critics then pointed out how investing in cryptocurrency can run counter to Tesla's environmental goals. Tesla made more profit from the 2021 investment than the profit from selling cars in 2020, due to the Bitcoin price increase after the investment was announced.

The quarter ending June 2021 was the first time Tesla made a profit independent of Bitcoin and regulatory credits.

Senior leadership

List of chief executives 

 Martin Eberhard (2004–2007)
 Ze'ev Drori (2007–2008)
 Elon Musk (since October 2008)

List of board chairs 
 Elon Musk (2004–2018)
 Robyn Denholm (since November 2018)

Board of directors 
In an April 2017 public letter, a group of influential Tesla investors, including the California State Teachers' Retirement System, asked Tesla to add two new independent directors to its board "who do not have any ties with chief executive Elon Musk". The investors wrote that "five of six current non-executive directors have professional or personal ties to Mr. Musk that could put at risk their ability to exercise independent judgement." Tesla's directors at the time included Brad Buss, who served as chief financial officer at SolarCity; Steve Jurvetson, a venture capitalist who also sits on the board of SpaceX; Elon Musk's brother, Kimbal; and Ira Ehrenpreis and Antonio Gracias, both of whom also invested in SpaceX. The letter called for a more independent board that could put a check on groupthink. At first Musk responded on Twitter, writing that the investors "should buy Ford stock" because "their governance is amazing." Two days later, he promised he would add two independent board members; Kathleen Wilson-Thompson and Larry Ellison were added at the end of 2018. Ellison stepped down in August 2022.

Other previous board members include businessman Steve Westly; Daimler executive Herbert Kohler; and CEO and Chairman of Johnson Publishing Company Linda Johnson Rice.

As of September 2022, the board members are:

See also 
 List of automobile manufacturers of the United States
 List of Easter eggs in Tesla products
 List of production battery electric vehicles
 Plug-in electric vehicles in California
 Plug-in electric vehicles in the United States

Notes 
Footnotes

References

Further reading 
 Higgins, Tim (2021). Power Play: Tesla, Elon Musk, and the Bet of the Century. Doubleday. .
 
 Niedermeyer, Edward (2019). Ludicrous: The Unvarnished Story of Tesla Motors. Dallas: BenBella. . .

External links 

 

 
Car manufacturers of the United States
Battery electric vehicle manufacturers
Electric vehicle manufacturers of the United States
Luxury motor vehicle manufacturers
Motor vehicle manufacturers based in California
Sports car manufacturers
Companies based in Palo Alto, California
Manufacturing companies based in California
2003 establishments in California
Vehicle manufacturing companies established in 2003
Companies listed on the Nasdaq
Manufacturing companies based in the San Francisco Bay Area
2010 initial public offerings
Car brands
Elon Musk
Multinational companies headquartered in the United States
American companies established in 2003
Electric vehicle infrastructure developers
Electric motor manufacturers
Electric vehicle battery manufacturers
Motor vehicle manufacturers based in Texas
Production electric cars